Castlemagner GAA is a Gaelic Athletic Association club based in the village of Castlemagner in the north-west of County Cork, Ireland. Founded in 1900, the club plays both hurling and football and is affiliated with Duhallow GAA. The club currently competes in the Duhallow Junior A Hurling Championship and the Duhallow Junior A Football Championship. 

At under age level, the Castlemagner club amalgamates with Kilbrin as Croke Rovers - as neither club have been able to field an underage team on their own. Ladies' Gaelic football and camogie are also played within the club.

Honours
 Duhallow Junior A Football Championship Winners (6) 1947, 1948, 1952, 1957, 1960, 1961
 Duhallow Junior A Hurling Championship Winners (5) 1951, 1953, 1954, 1960, 2015
 Cork Junior Football Championship Winners (2) 1947, 1952
 Cork Junior Hurling Championship Winners (1) 1954 
 Cork Junior B Hurling Championship Winners (1) 2012  Runners-Up 2007

Noted players
 Pat O'Callaghan

See also
 Duhallow GAA
 Croke Rovers

References

Gaelic games clubs in County Cork
Gaelic football clubs in County Cork